Hemed Suleiman Abdulla (born 5 April 1973 in Kiwani, Pemba) is a Tanzanian CCM politician and 2nd Vice President of Zanzibar from 2020. He was nominated by the President Hussein Mwinyi to become a member of Zanzibar House of Representatives.

References 

1973 births
Living people
Tanzanian Muslims
Vice presidents of Zanzibar
Chama Cha Mapinduzi MPs
Zanzibari politicians
Tanzanian MPs 2020–2025
Chama Cha Mapinduzi politicians
Nominated Tanzanian MPs
Members of the Zanzibar House of Representatives